Battisti is a surname of Italian origin. The name refers to:
Carlo Battisti (1882–1977), Italian linguist and actor
Cesare Battisti (born 1954), Italian writer, former member of Armed Proletarians for Communism, also a convicted murderer in Italy, currently a refugee in Brazil
Cesare Battisti (politician) (1875–1916), Italian-Austrian irredentist; hanged by the Austro-Hungarian regime during World War I
Frank J. Battisti (1922–1994), American jurist on the United States Circuit Court
Gianfranco Battisti (born 1962), Italian corporate executive
Leda Battisti (born 1971), Italian singer-songwriter
Lucio Battisti (1943–1998), Italian singer-songwriter and composer
Rita Battisti (born 1987), Italian former long track speed skater
John Charles Battisti Best Operations NCO in the Army Reserve 
Carla Battisti Irish journalist and radio producer

Italian-language surnames